The first-generation Honda Civic is an automobile that was produced by Honda in Japan from July 1972 until 1979. It was their first genuine market success, eschewing the air-cooling and expensive engineering solutions of the slow-selling Honda 1300 and being larger than the minuscule N-series. The Civic laid down the direction Honda's automobile design has followed since.

Model year changes
The Civic was largely developed as a new platform, and was the result of taking the previous Honda N600 and increasing the length, width, height and wheelbase. The hatchback version added a fold-down rear seat, an AM radio, and cloth upholstery. The car had front and rear independent suspension. A four-speed manual transmission was standard. Options for the Civic were kept to a minimum, consisting of air conditioning, a two-speed  semi-automatic transmission called the Hondamatic, radial tires, and a rear wiper for the hatchback.

The Civic was one of the first Honda cars to be sold in Britain when it was launched there in 1972, at a time when the sale of Japanese cars from Honda's competitors Nissan and Toyota were soaring. Its compact design and economical engine ensured that it sold well in Britain in the aftermath of the 1973 oil crisis.

The four-door sedan version of this body style (basically identical to the hatchback but with fixed rear window and opening lower trunk lid) was never available in the United States, and the five-door hatchback did not appear until 1978, just before the introduction of the second generation model. The five-door had been presented in Japan in September 1977, with the four-door sedan being retired in June 1978.

The Civic's smaller size allowed it to outperform American competitors such as the Chevrolet Vega and Ford Pinto. When the 1973 oil crisis struck, automobile buyers turned to economy cars. Good fuel mileage benefited the standing of the Honda Civic in the lucrative U.S. market. In the United States after 1976, the advertising campaign used to introduce the Civic was, "Honda, we make it simple." (replacing the tagline "What the world is coming to.") The tagline (also known by the WMIS acronym) was later used with other Honda motor vehicles until the 1984 model year when the company revamped its product lineup.

For 1974, the Civic's engine size grew slightly, to 1237 cc and power went up to 52 hp (38 kW). In order to meet the new North American 5 mph (8 km/h) bumper impact standard, the Civic's bumpers grew 7.1 inches (18 cm), increasing overall length to 146.9 inches (373 cm). The CVCC (Compound Vortex Controlled Combustion) engine debuted in 1975 and was offered alongside the standard Civic engine. The optional 53 hp (39 kW) CVCC engine displaced 1488 cc and had a head design that promoted cleaner, more efficient combustion. The CVCC design eliminated the need for catalytic converters or unleaded fuel to meet changing emissions standards, unlike nearly every other U.S. market car. Due to California's stricter emissions standards, only the CVCC powered Civic was available in that state. This created a sales advantage in Honda's favor in that CVCC equipped Honda products afforded the buyer the ability to choose any type of fuel the buyer wanted, and due to emissions equipment not being damaged by using leaded fuel, the buyer could use any gasoline products available. This was also an advantage due to some regions of North America having to ration available gasoline supplies due to periodic shortages at the time.

Civic sales also increased and topped 100,000 units for this year.

1978 brought slight cosmetic changes: the grille was black; the rear-facing hood vents replaced the sideways vents; the tail lamps were changed from 1/3 amber signals to 1/2 amber signals of grooved lens; reverse light was doubled and mounted in the rear bumper integrated with reflectors; and turn indicators integrated with position lamps were mounted in the front bumper instead of in the grille. The CVCC engine was now rated at 60 hp (45 kW).

Sporting variants

In October 1974, Civic's first sport model was added to the lineup. The Civic 1200 RS was only sold in the domestic Japanese market; its name is an abbreviation of "Road Sailing." It is powered by a 1169 cc SOHC 8-valve EB engine fitted with dual Keihin CV carburettors, a free-flowing intake manifold, more aggressive cam, high-compression pistons and a unique exhaust header. The transmission was also replaced with a 5-speed manual transmission and the suspension received stiffer springs and dampers for better handling. In total, about 20,000 Civic RS were built in a twelve-month production span.

In October 1975, to meet new stricter emission regulations, the 1200 RS was replaced by the low polluting 1500 RSL/GTL with a 1488 cc CVCC SOHC 12-valve ED engine. These outputs were 2 PS and 3 Nm more than that of the regular 1.5 L models, thanks to an increased compression ratio and other modifications.

Rust Recalls
The first generation Honda Civics were notorious for rusting in less than three years from purchase where salt was used in the winter. The U.S. importer, American Honda Motor Company, signed a final consent decree with the Federal Trade Commission that provided owners of 1975-1979 Civics with rusted fenders the right to receive replacements or cash reimbursements. In the end, almost 1 million Honda owners were notified that their fenders could be repaired or replaced by the automaker at no charge. About 10% of all Hondas sold were to be inspected by a dealer, and the automaker had 180 days to replace front fenders and supporting parts that showed rust within the first three years of use.

The Hondas were so vulnerable to corrosion that the National Highway Traffic Safety Administration (NHTSA) also issued a safety recall. This was because the car's lateral suspension arms, front crossbeam, and strut coil spring lower supports could weaken with exposure to salt. A total of 936,774 vehicles built between 1 September 1972 and 1 August 1979 were subject to extensive repairs since Honda had to replace the suspension components, or the automaker bought back entire cars with serious body corrosion.

At the time, Honda's rust recall was the largest safety action among all the brands imported into the U.S. Civics became known for their "typical Honda rust" in the used car market.

Overseas assembly

New Zealand
The first generation Civic – a 1.2-litre, three-door manual, was assembled in 1976 from CKD kits in New Zealand by importer and distributor New Zealand Motor Corporation (NZMC) at its Petone plant near Wellington. This was the first time Honda cars had been assembled outside Japan. The first generation NZ Civic was also offered with optional two-speed semi-automatic 'Hondamatic' transmission. Earlier cars had, from 1973, been imported assembled by the Moller Group before NZMC took over the Honda franchise but availability was limited due to restrictions on built-up imports. All subsequent Civic generations were assembled in New Zealand until car manufacture there ceased in 1998.

Indonesia
The first generation Honda Civic entered Indonesian market in 1972 and was imported from Japan through PT Imora Motor. Indonesian government issued a ban on importing fully built-up vehicles since 1974. As the result, the first generation Civic was assembled in Indonesia from 1975 until 1980 by PT Prospect Motor at Sunter, North Jakarta.

Only 4-door and 5-door body styles were assembled in Indonesia, originally with a 1.2 L engine and 4-speed manual transmission. In 1976, the 1.2 L engine was replaced with a bigger 1.5 L CVCC engine. The 4-speed manual transmission also being replaced with 5-speed manual transmission or 2-speed "Hondamatic" automatic transmission.

Gallery

References

01
Cars introduced in 1972
Sedans
Hatchbacks
Station wagons
Front-wheel-drive vehicles